Diacolax is a genus of medium-sized sea snails, marine gastropod mollusks in the family Eulimidae.

Species
There is only one known species to exist within this genus, this includes the following:

 Diacolax cucumariae (Mandahl-Barth, 1946)

References

External links
 To World Register of Marine Species

Eulimidae